"There's a New Moon Over My Shoulder" is a 1944 song written by Jimmie Davis, Ekko Whelan, and Lee Blastic and made popular by Tex Ritter.  The song was the B-side to Tex Ritter's, "I'm Wastin' My Tears on You".  "There's a New Moon Over My Shoulder" peaked at number two on the Folk Juke Box charts.

Other versions
In 1945 Jimmie Davis recorded his version which made it to number one for one week on the Folk Juke Box charts and spent a total of eighteen weeks on the chart.
Bill Haley & His Comets included the song on the album Haley's Juke Box (1960)
Jim Reeves recorded a version on his 1964 album Moonlight and Roses.
Wanda Jackson recorded a version on her 1966 album Wanda Jackson Salutes the Country Music Hall of Fame.
Mac Wiseman, Doc Watson, and Del McCoury recorded a version for their 1995 collaborative album, Del Doc & Mac.
Larry Sparks recorded a version for the soundtrack of the 2005 movie Transamerica.

References

 
 

1944 songs
1945 singles
Tex Ritter songs
Jimmie Davis songs
Songs written by Jimmie Davis